Julius Jørgensen (20 June 1880 – 3 October 1937 was a Danish long-distance runner. He competed in the men's marathon at the 1908 Summer Olympics.

References

1880 births
1937 deaths
Athletes (track and field) at the 1908 Summer Olympics
Danish male long-distance runners
Danish male marathon runners
Olympic athletes of Denmark
Place of birth missing